Levski Sofia II or Levski Sofia B is the reserve team of Levski Sofia. Founded in 2022, it currently plays in the Third League.

Not being able to be in the same division as the main team, Levski II is ineligible for promotion to the First League and also cannot compete in the Bulgarian Cup.

History

2022–present: Foundation
Since 2015, the Bulgarian Football Union allowed teams to have reserve sides in the lower regional divisions. With the idea to give youth players the chance to get senior experience in men's football, Levski Sofia announced it has founded a reserve team that will compete in the Third League during its inaugural 2022–23 season. On 4 June 2022, Elin Topuzakov was announced as the head coach of the team. It will consist mostly of players from the U19 squad.

Squad

 For first team players, see Levski Sofia.

Personnel

Managerial history

References

External links
Official website
Profile at Levski Academy

Levski Sofia
Association football clubs established in 2022
2022 establishments in Bulgaria
II
Bulgarian reserve football teams